When I Sing may refer to:

"When I Sing", song by Bill Henderson (Canadian singer) from Bye Bye Blues (film) 1983 Juno Award
"When I Sing", song by UHF from UHF  1990
"When I Sing", song by Needtobreathe from  Hard Love 2016